Tommi Paakkolanvaara is a Finnish professional ice hockey forward who currently plays for Pelicans of the SM-liiga.

References

External links

1983 births
Finnish ice hockey forwards
Living people
Hokki players
Oulun Kärpät players
Lahti Pelicans players
Sportspeople from North Ostrobothnia